Ana Maria Bahiana is a Brazilian-born Los Angeles-based American author, journalist and lecturer known for her work in cultural journalism. She has worked in a variety of media: newspapers, magazines, television, radio and the Internet.

Biography
Ana Maria Bahiana was born in Rio de Janeiro, Brazil.

While still in college Bahiana worked as editorial assistant at the first Brazilian edition of Rolling Stone magazine in 1972, for which she also contributed reviews and interviews. She wrote for the major Brazilian newspapers – O Estado de S. Paulo, Folha de S. Paulo, O Globo and Jornal do Brasil. In the international press, she contributed to publications in France, United States and Australia, and worked for five years as West Coast Bureau Chief for the British trade magazine Screen International. On television, Bahiana was foreign correspondent in Los Angeles for Telecine, Globosat and Rede Globo, having also collaborated, as producer and interviewer for the US cable channel Bravo and Canada's CBN.

Bahiana and Paoula Abou-Jaoudé are the only Brazilian members of the Hollywood Foreign Press Association, responsible for the Golden Globes annual awards; since 2015 Bahiana has been serving as deputy editor of the HFPA's official website, www.goldenglobes.com .
In 2006, she wrote and co-produced, the feature film  1972, directed by José Emilio Rondeau.

Bahiana is currently working as writer and researcher on the documentary LA+Rio.

Music 
In 1970, while still in college, Bahiana got involved in Rio de Janeiro's independent/underground music scene. There she met composer José Mauro, and started a collaboration that would yield two recorded albums, Obnoxius (1970) and Viagem das Horas (1971).

Through the years, parallel to her work as author and journalist, Bahiana wrote lyrics for composers Marlui Miranda, Sueli Costa and the bands O Faia  and Contas de Vidro.

Works 
 Almanaque 1964 (Companhia das Letras, 2014).
 Como Ver Um Filme (Nova Fronteira, 2012).
 Almanaque anos 70 (Ediouro, 2006).
 Nada será como antes (Editora Nova Fronteira, 1979; Editora Senac Rio, 2006).
 Jimi Hendrix: domador de raios (Editora  Brasiliense, 1979; Editora Pazulin, 2006).
 América de A a Z (Editora Objetiva, 1994).
 A luz da lente (Editora Globo, 1998).

Collaborations 

 "Unsung Pioneers, Fierce Explorers – Female Filmmakers in Latin America", in the omnibus Celluloid Ceiling, org. Gabrielle Kelly and Cheryl Robson, Supernova Books, London, 2014
 Interview: Kathryn Bigelow, in the anthology Kathryn Bigelow, org. Peter Keough, University Press of New England, Boston, 2013.
"An Offer He Could Not Refuse: Francis Ford  Coppola on The Godfather III," in the anthology The Godfather Family Album, Taschen America, Los Angeles, 2009.
Vida Modelo, with John Casablancas; authorized biography, Objetiva, Rio de Janeiro, 2008.
"Tom Jobim", "Caetano Veloso", "Jorge Benjor" -  curated, researched and wrote bilingual (English-Portuguese) booklets for these CD boxed sets, Universal Music, 2007–2008.
"Los Angeles". An essay in the omnibus America, edited by Nelson Brissac Peixoto, Companhia das Letras, São Paulo, Brazil, 1989.
 "Anos 70 – Música Popular", collection of essays, Funarte, Rio de Janeiro, Brazil, 1980

Translation 
 Easy Riders, Raging Bulls/ Como a Geração Sexo Drogas e Rock n Roll Salvou Hollywood, Peter Biskind, Intrínseca, Rio de Janeiro, 2006.
 Dispatches/ Despachos do Front, Michael Herr, Objetiva, Rio de Janeiro, 2005.

References 

Writers from Rio de Janeiro (city)
20th-century Brazilian women writers
21st-century Brazilian women writers
21st-century Brazilian writers
Brazilian screenwriters
Brazilian journalists
1950 births
Living people
Brazilian women screenwriters